ent-Isokaurene synthase (EC 4.2.3.103, OsKSL5i, OsKSL6) is an enzyme with systematic name ent-copalyl-diphosphate diphosphate-lyase (cyclizing, ent-isokaurene-forming). This enzyme catalyses the following chemical reaction

 ent-copalyl diphosphate  ent-isokaurene + diphosphate

Two enzymes of the rice sub-species Oryza sativa ssp. indica, OsKSL5 and OsKSL6, produce ent-isokaurene.

References

External links 
 

EC 4.2.3